Andrew Deane (born 28 July 1967) is an Australian field hockey player. He competed in the men's tournament at the 1988 Summer Olympics.

References

External links
 

1967 births
Living people
Australian male field hockey players
Olympic field hockey players of Australia
Field hockey players at the 1988 Summer Olympics
Place of birth missing (living people)